Ballet is a 1995 American documentary film directed by Frederick Wiseman. It portrays rehearsals, choreography, performances, business transactions, and other day-to-day life of the American Ballet Theatre. Much of the footage dates from the 1992 season. It also includes scenes from the company's European tour, namely in Greece and Copenhagen.

Appearances are made by Susan Jaffe, Julie Kent, Julio Bocca, Angel Corella, Amanda McKerrow, Alessandra Ferri and others. Various ballet masters and choreographers also appear, including Kevin McKenzie, ABT's artistic director, Ulysses Dove, Irina Kolpakova, Natalia Makarova and Agnes de Mille. Business transactions by then-director Jane Hermann are also included.

The film is currently released to the public by Wiseman's distribution company, Zipporah Films

References

External links
 Zipporah Films
 

1995 films
American documentary films
Documentary films about ballet
Films directed by Frederick Wiseman
1995 documentary films
American Ballet Theatre
1990s English-language films
1990s American films